Reginald "Reg" Hathway (first ¼ 1907 – death unknown) was a Welsh rugby union and professional rugby league footballer who played in the 1920s and 1930s.

Background
Reg Hathway's birth was registered Newport district, Wales.

Playing career

International honours
Reg Hathway won caps for Wales while at Oldham 1932 2-caps.

Championship final appearances
Reg Hathway played left-, i.e. number 11, in Wigan's 15–3 victory over Salford in the Championship Final during the 1933–34 season at Wilderspool Stadium, Warrington on Saturday 28 April 1934.

Club career
Reg Hathway played in Newport RFC's 3-20 defeat by New South Wales Waratahs during the 1927–28 Waratahs tour of the British Isles, France and Canada at Rodney Parade, Newport, Wales on Thursday 22 September 1927.

Genealogical information
Reg Hathway was the younger brother of the rugby union forward of the 1920s for Wales, Newport RFC, Cross Keys RFC and London Welsh RFC; George Hathway.

References

External links
Statistics at blackandambers.co.uk
Statistics at orl-heritagetrust.org.uk
Statistics at wigan.rlfans.com

1907 births
Newport RFC players
Oldham R.L.F.C. players
Place of death missing
Rugby league locks
Rugby league players from Newport, Wales
Rugby league second-rows
Rugby union forwards
Rugby union players from Newport, Wales
Wales national rugby league team players
Welsh rugby league players
Welsh rugby union players
Wigan Warriors players
Year of death missing